The Bafaw people are Bantus and live in Meme division of the South West Region of Cameroon. They make up 10 towns or villages, namely: Kokubuma, Kombone Bafaw, Dikomi, Kurume, Bolo, Ikiliwindi, Mambanda, Kumba, Dieka and Njanga each ruled by a chief known as “Nfon.”

The Bafaw Paramount chief is His Royal Highness Nfon Ekoko Mukete.

The Bafaw and the Bafaw language are related linguistically, culturally and historically to the Mbo, Bakossi, Belongs, Bassossi, Bakundu and Douala tribes.

References

People from Southwest Region (Cameroon)